Renée Auphan (born 2 June 1941) is a Franco-Swiss singer and director of opera.

Life 
Born in Marseille, Auphan studied singing at the Monte-Carlo Conservatory. She worked at the Opéra de Marseille and Opéra de Monte-Carlo as an assistant director, stage manager and artistic administrator. She received the first prize for singing (soprano) at the Rainier-III Academy of Music. In 1983, she was appointed director of the Opéra de Lausanne which she directed from October 1984 to June 1995 and then of the Grand Théâtre de Genève until 2001.

Auphan was appointed at the head of the Opéra de Marseille where she began her career as an assistant director at the opera house. On 1 January 2002, she officially succeeded Jean-Louis Pujol, whose contract, which expired at the end of April 2001, was not renewed.

In April 2013, she staged l'Aiglon by Jacques Ibert and Arthur Honegger at the Opéra de Lausanne.

References

External links 
 Opéra de Lausanne, some history
 Opéra : à Marseille, Renée Auphan tire sa révérence avec "Manon" Le Monde (8 May 2008)
 Renée Auphan : « Les voix sont toujours les mêmes. En revanche les comportements ont changé… » on Forum Opera
 Renée Auphan à la tête de l'Opéra de Marseille on Libération (6 September 2001)

1941 births
Living people
Musicians from Marseille
French opera directors
Chevaliers of the Légion d'honneur